Mayrornis is a genus of bird in the family Monarchidae found in the Solomon Islands and Fiji. The name Mayrornis is a compound word. The first part, Mayr, commemorates Ernst Walter Mayr, a German ornithologist and systematist. The second part, ornis, is the Greek word meaning "bird". Established by Frank Alexander Wetmore in 1932, it contains the following species:

References

 
Bird genera
Taxa named by Alexander Wetmore
Taxonomy articles created by Polbot